Simple je – Débranchée à Bercy is a live album by French singer France Gall, released in October 1993.

Track listing

Certifications

References 

France Gall albums
1993 live albums
Warner Records albums